Notagonum lafertei is a species of ground beetle in the subfamily Platyninae. It was described by Xavier Montrouzier in 1860.

References

Notagonum
Beetles described in 1860